Systelloderes biceps is a species of gnat bug in the family Enicocephalidae. It is found in Central America and North America.

References

Enicocephalomorpha
Articles created by Qbugbot
Insects described in 1832